Sungai Dua is a township in Butterworth, Seberang Perai, Penang, Malaysia. Not to be confuse for Sungai Dua on George Town, the Sungai Dua on Butterworth is located to the north of Perai River and to the east of the North-South Expressway. This area has experienced rapid housing development.

The main road in Sungai Dua is Jalan Sungai Dua  which pass over the township. The exit 165 of the North-South Expressway Northern Route (Sungai Dua IC) was located near the township.

Schools

SK Sungai Dua
SRJK (C) Kai Chee
SMK Datuk Haji Ahmad Said
 Desa Murni Sixth Form College (Kolej Tingkatan Enam Desa Murni)

See also 
 Butterworth, Penang
 Perai

References 

Populated places in Penang